Darrin John Chapin (born February 1, 1966) is an American former professional baseball relief pitcher, who played in Major League Baseball (MLB) during the 1991 and 1992 seasons. Listed at 6 feet 0 inches, 170 lb., he batted and threw right-handed.

Career
Chapin was a 1984 graduate of Champion High School, where he lettered three years in both football and basketball. He was an outstanding quarterback for the Golden Flashes football team and still holds the single-game passing record of 279 yards. As the point guard for the Flashes basketball team, he averaged eleven points and seven assists per game. Additionally, he lettered all four years in baseball. While pitching for the Flashes, he led his team to three league championships and received All-Ohio honors in baseball in his senior year. Notably, he is the only Champion High School alumni to have played in Major League Baseball.

Chapin later attended Cuyahoga Community College in Cleveland, Ohio, where he played for the Tri-C's Baseball team. Following his graduation, he enrolled at Cleveland State University in Ohio and was a member of the Cleveland State Vikings Baseball club in 1985, joining Dale Mohorcic as the only Tri-C's/Vikings players to perform in the Major Leagues.

The New York Yankees selected Chapin in the sixth round of the 1986 MLB Draft out of Cuyahoga Community College. He spent six years in the organization from 1986 to 1991, which included a brief stint with the big club in 1991. Chapin made three relief appearances for the Yankees and lost a decision, allowing three earned runs on three hits and six walks while striking out five in  innings of work.

In 1992, Chapin was sent to the Philadelphia Phillies in the same transaction that brought Charlie Hayes to the Yankees. Chapin pitched two innings of relief in his only appearance for the Phillies, giving up three earned runs on two hits, and struck out a batter without walks. Overall, he posted a 0–1 record and a 6.14 ERA with six strikeouts and six walks in 7 ⅓ innings.

Besides the Yankees and Indians, Chaplin played for the Minnesota Twins, Florida Marlins and Cleveland Indians in their Minor League systems. In ten seasons from 1986 to 1995, he went 40–28 with a 3.48 ERA and 15 saves in 367 games. He also pitched with the Broncos de Reynosa of the Mexican League in 1995, going 1–1 with a 1.48 ERA and three saves in 11 games.

In between, Chapin played winter ball with the Navegantes del Magallanes, Tigres de Aragua and Leones del Caracas clubs of the Venezuelan League in three seasons spanning 1990–1993. He compiled an overall record of 7–3 with a 3.92 ERA and seven saves in 38 pitching appearances, including seven as a starter.

Chapin gained induction into the Champion Athletic Hall of Fame as part of its 2004 class. He lives in his native Warren with his wife and five children.

Sources

External links

Darrin Chapin at Baseball Almanac
Darrin Chapin at Baseball Gauge

1966 births
Living people
Albany-Colonie Yankees players
American expatriate baseball players in Canada
American expatriate baseball players in Mexico
Baseball players from Ohio
Broncos de Reynosa players
Buffalo Bisons (minor league) players
Canton-Akron Indians players
Cleveland State Vikings baseball players
Columbus Clippers players
Edmonton Trappers players
Fort Lauderdale Yankees players
Gulf Coast Yankees players
Leones del Caracas players
Major League Baseball pitchers
Mexican League baseball pitchers
Navegantes del Magallanes players
American expatriate baseball players in Venezuela
New York Yankees players
Oneonta Yankees players
Sportspeople from Warren, Ohio
Philadelphia Phillies players
Portland Beavers players
Scranton/Wilkes-Barre Red Barons players
Tigres de Aragua players
Tri-C Triceratops baseball players